Semyon Vyacheslavovich Pomogayev (born 1 November 1993) is a Russian football midfielder. He plays as a central midfielder.

Club career
He made his debut in the Russian Second Division for FC Tyumen on 16 September 2012 in a game against FC Lada-Togliatti Togliatti.

He made his Russian Football National League debut for FC Ural Yekaterinburg on 1 April 2013 in a game against FC Tom Tomsk.

Career statistics

Club

References

External links
 Career summary by sportbox.ru

1993 births
Living people
Russian footballers
Association football midfielders
FC Tyumen players
FC Ural Yekaterinburg players
FC Dynamo Saint Petersburg players
FC Baltika Kaliningrad players